During his 40-year career, the Indonesian pop singer Chrisye (1949–2007) recorded more than 200 songs as a vocalist, writing many of them by himself or in collaboration with others. In 2009  Rolling Stone Indonesia selected four of these ("Lilin-Lilin Kecil" at number 13, "Merpati Putih" at number 43, "Anak Jalanan" at number 72, and "Merepih Alam" at number 90) as among the best Indonesian songs of all time.

After starting his professional music career as a bass guitarist with the band Sabda Nada (later renamed Gipsy) in the late 1960s, Chrisye recorded his first vocals in 1976 on the album Guruh Gipsy, a collaboration between Gipsy and Guruh Sukarnoputra. The following year, he recorded "Lilin-Lilin Kecil" for the Prambors Radio Teenage Songwriting Competition (or LCLR); the song, written by James F. Sundah, became his signature song. Beginning with Badai Pasti Berlalu (1977), Chrisye wrote some of his own songs; his first songwriting credit was "Merepih Alam".

After changing collaborators several times over his early solo albums, starting with Sabda Alam (1978), in 1983 Chrisye recorded a trilogy of albums for which Jockie Soerjoprajogo and Eros Djarot – with whom he had worked on Badai Pasti Berlalu – wrote or co-wrote most of the songs. After the trio disbanded in 1984, Chrisye produced another three albums with young songwriter Adjie Soetomo. This collaboration was followed by two albums arranged by Younky Suwarno, in 1988 and 1989. During the final twelve years of his career, Chrisye worked with several young artists, with arrangement generally handled by Erwin Gutawa.

Most of Chrisye's songs were original, and several, written by different persons, have the same title; the title with the most iterations is "Cinta Kita", which has three different tracks attached to it. Most were in Indonesian, although he recorded four songs in English and two in Balinese. Chrisye also covered several works by other writers, most prominently on his 2002 cover album – the only such album he made – Dekade, in which he covered eight Indonesian songs dating from the 1940s to 1990s. In other cases, his older hits were given new arrangements; Erwin Gutawa, who collaborated with Chrisye for a decade in the 1990s, did so to several of Chrisye's songs on AkustiChrisye (1996) and a new version of Badai Pasti Berlalu (1999). Chrisye was accused of plagiarism on two occasions: first in 1985 with "Hip Hip Hura" (said to plagiarise to Kenny Loggins's 1984 song "Footloose"), then in 1988 with "Jumpa Pertama" (said to plagiarise Sheena Easton's 1980 song "9 to 5").

This list includes song titles and their literal English translations, if applicable; song titles that do not need translation but have a possibly unclear meaning have notes after the title. Unless otherwise noted, all songs are in Indonesian. Songs performed but not recorded are not listed.

Released songs

References

Footnotes

Bibliography 

Chrisye